"Finger" is the fifth episode of the third series of British television sitcom, Bottom. It was first broadcast on 3 February 1995.

Synopsis
Returning to their flat after a cricket match, Richie is unhappy that Eddie, who was umpiring the match from the bar in the clubhouse and get information from Spudgun who's the captain of the opposite team, gave him out of what should have been a no-ball: Welsh cricketer "Cannonball" Taffy O'Jones had bowled a beamer at Richie's head with a slingshot, causing him to collapse unconscious into his stumps. As they discuss the finer points of cricket, Eddie reveals that the match was a "stag cricket match" for O'Jones, who is getting married that afternoon to a woman from the Slaughterhouse who looks like Ted Rogers; the opportunity to knock Richie unconscious was a wedding present.

Meanwhile, in his capacity as umpire, Eddie has stolen a wide array of hats, jumpers, and trousers from the other players (due to a particularly wild party afterwards), and he find O'Jones' car keys. Richie wants to use them for unambitious pranks, and the two find the car parked outside the church where O'Jones is getting married. Richie attempts to move the car around the corner so O'Jones can't find it, but his inability to drive means he and Eddie accidentally ram-raid the local off-licence (where Eddie takes cans of beer) and speed off into the countryside. Searching the car's glove compartment, Eddie finds the O'Jones' honeymoon reservation at a hotel in glamorous (by their standards) Wolverhampton, and the two decide to steal the honeymoon as well.

Richie and Eddie arrive at the hotel, Eddie dressed up as 'Edwina' to fool the hotel staff into thinking they are the O'Jones newlyweds. Because the hotel is full and they cannot get separate rooms, Richie and Eddie violently argue over who gets to sleep in the room's bed. Eddie wins the argument, but Richie gives Eddie one last kick in the "bollocks" and Eddie passes out.

Richie drags the unconscious Eddie to their room, where he insults the bellhop who brought up their luggage and refuses to give him a tip. Richie then tries to seduce a hotel maid who has arrived with the couple's complimentary honeymoon biscuits. Richie tries to talk the maid into getting naked and taking a shower, only to have a revived Eddie punch him out. Eddie himself then tries to seduce the maid, who ends up kicking Eddie in the testicles.

Richie and Eddie later head to the hotel's restaurant, only to fall down a flight of stairs on the way to the hotel lobby. Eddie takes every possible opportunity to make a scene and force Richie to behave chivalrously. In the restaurant, Richie manages to clear out the dining room with a horrible Leonard Rossiter impression. Later, Eddie goes to the women's restroom and mistakes the sink for a urinal. He then tries to seduce a female patron in the restroom, telling her that he is a lesbian - only to receive another (off-screen) kick to the testicles. As the two run up a huge drinks bill at dinner, one of the hotel's male waiters takes a fancy to Eddie. For some reason (possibly intoxication) Eddie is keen, and Richie becomes jealous and challenges the waiter to a fistfight. The fight is called off when an enraged Taffy O'Jones tracks the boys down and (from offscreen) throws cricket balls at their faces.

Notes

Background
This episode provides a possible explanation for the look of disgust on Richie's face when eating the fish finger in 's Up". It is revealed that Eddie often hollows out fish fingers and pokes in dog excrement, catching Richie out regularly.

Breaking the fourth wall
 Questionably, Richie impersonating "Cannonball" Taffy O'Jones by shouting "You ignorant English wanker!" directly at the camera may qualify.

Continuity and production errors
 Richie and Eddie attempt to steal "Cannonball" Taffy O'Jones's car wearing a pair of tights as a disguise. After Richie abandons his half of the disguise, the tights change place on Eddie's head twice. Outside the car, the one leg is above his right eye and the other below his left ear. Inside the car they have moved to one leg under his right ear and the other leg on his nose. When in the off licence, they have moved again to one leg above his right ear and the other in the middle of his forehead.
 When the maitre d' is seating Eddie, there is a wide shot showing two men seated at the corner table behind. The camera angle changes to a close up of Eddie being tucked in, and a man hurries past the maitre'd towards the corner table. A second later the shot changes back to the wide angle, and there are still only two men at the table behind.
 When Eddie orders a pint of mild ("Make it a double!"), Marcel turns around, browsing the shelves behind, before turning again, ducking under the bar. A moment later, he produces the pint. At no point does he actually pour the drink. He just finds it under the bar, looking decidedly flat.
 "Cannonball" Taffy O'Jones sounds distinctly like Marcel, only with a Welsh accent instead of French.
 The bellhop has a speaking part but is not credited at the end – he was played by the show's producer, Jon Plowman.

Cast

1995 British television episodes
Bottom (TV series)
Cross-dressing in television
Wolverhampton